Back in the U.S. (subtitled Live 2002) is a double live album by Paul McCartney from his spring 2002 Driving USA Tour in the US in support of his 2001 release Driving Rain. It was released with an accompanying DVD to commemorate his first set of concerts in almost ten years.

Band
Using most of the musicians that appeared on Driving Rain, McCartney assembled a new live act composed of Rusty Anderson and Brian Ray on guitar, Abe Laboriel Jr. on drums and keyboardist Paul Wickens, who had been on McCartney's previous two tours, in 1989–90 and 1993. As of 2022, these four musicians are still members of McCartney's touring band.

Controversy
Although McCartney was promoting Driving Rain, the majority of the tour setlist celebrated his past, by featuring a sampling of his solo work with and without Wings, and a substantial number of the hits he had written while a member of the Beatles. On Back in the U.S., McCartney reversed the songwriting credits for 19 Lennon–McCartney compositions to read "Paul McCartney and John Lennon" – a move that author Howard Sounes describes as the live album's "chief point of interest". This gesture was a further attempt by McCartney to establish his legacy following Lennon's death in 1980, having been vetoed from adopting the McCartney–Lennon credit during the Beatles Anthology project in 1995 by his former bandmates George Harrison and Ringo Starr.

The revised credits on Back in the U.S. incensed Lennon's widow, Yoko Ono, who threatened to take legal action, while Starr said he found McCartney's actions "underhanded". Some commentators observed that McCartney had similarly credited his Beatles songs to "McCartney–Lennon" on the 1976 live album Wings over America and that Lennon had never publicly objected to the reversal; in addition, the compositions in question were written with little or no input from Lennon. When compiling Back in the U.S., McCartney had decided to act in response to Ono's dropping of his co-writer's credit for "Give Peace a Chance", on the 1997 compilation Lennon Legend: The Very Best of John Lennon. Despite their differences on this issue, McCartney and Starr united on stage for the Harrison tribute concert shortly after the release of the live album.

Release
Back in the U.S. was issued in November 2002 as an exclusive North American and Japanese release (an international edition with a slight track listing change, entitled Back in the World, was released a few months later). Back in the U.S. sold well on export and gained sales of over 2 million globally. The album debuted at number 8 on the US charts with sales of 224,000 copies, marking his highest sales during a single week since the introduction of Nielsen SoundScan in 1991. The album was certified double platinum in America, for shipments of over 2 million units. It entered the top five on the Japanese chart, making McCartney one of the Western artists with the most top-ten albums in that country. Its tie-in DVD proved to be a strong seller as well. Back in the U.S. was the first Paul McCartney album not released on vinyl.

Track listing
All songs written by Lennon–McCartney, except where noted.

CD

Disc one
"Hello, Goodbye" – 3:46 (Detroit)
"Jet" (Paul McCartney, Linda McCartney) – 4:02 (Dallas night 1 + 8 seconds of DC night 1)
"All My Loving" – 2:08 (Cleveland) 
"Getting Better" – 3:10 (Denver) 
"Coming Up" (Paul McCartney) – 3:26 (New York City Madison Square Garden Night 1)
"Let Me Roll It" (Paul McCartney, Linda McCartney) – 4:24 (Chicago Night 2)
"Lonely Road" (Paul McCartney) – 3:12 (Sunrise night 1) 
"Driving Rain" (Paul McCartney) – 3:11 (Chicago night 2) 
"Your Loving Flame" (Paul McCartney) – 3:28 (New York City Madison Square Garden Night 1)
"Blackbird" – 2:30 (Boston)
"Every Night" (Paul McCartney) – 2:51 (Dallas night 1)
"We Can Work It Out" – 2:29 (Chicago night 2)
"Mother Nature's Son" – 2:11 (Dallas Night 2)
"Vanilla Sky" (Paul McCartney) – 2:29 (Dallas night 2) 
"Carry That Weight" – 3:05
 From start to 1:58, the song "You Never Give Me Your Money" is played. (Tampa)
"The Fool on the Hill" – 3:09 (DC Night 1)
"Here Today" (Paul McCartney) – 2:28 (Toronto)
 McCartney's tribute to John Lennon
"Something" (George Harrison) – 2:33 (Tampa)
 A tribute cover of one of George Harrison's most famous songs, played on the ukulele – one of Harrison's favourite instruments

Disc two
"Eleanor Rigby" – 2:17 (Denver)
"Here, There and Everywhere" – 2:26 (Chicago night 2)
"Band on the Run" (Paul McCartney, Linda McCartney) – 5:00 (Dallas night 1) 
"Back in the U.S.S.R." – 2:55 (Dallas night 1) 
"Maybe I'm Amazed" (Paul McCartney) – 4:48 (East Rutherford)
"C Moon" (Paul McCartney, Linda McCartney) – 3:51 (DC night 1)
"My Love" (Paul McCartney, Linda McCartney) – 4:03 (Dallas night 1) 
"Can't Buy Me Love" – 2:09 (Atlanta night 2)
"Freedom" (Paul McCartney) – 3:18 (Dallas night 1) 
"Live and Let Die" (Paul McCartney, Linda McCartney) – 3:05 (Dallas night 1) 
"Let It Be" – 3:57 (Atlanta night 2)
"Hey Jude" – 7:01 (NYC Madison Square Garden Night 1) 
"The Long and Winding Road" – 3:30 (Denver)
"Lady Madonna" – 2:21 (NYC Madison Square Garden night 1 
"I Saw Her Standing There" – 3:08 (Sunrise)
"Yesterday" – 2:08 (Dallas night 1)
"Sgt. Pepper's Lonely Hearts Club Band (Reprise)" / "The End" – 4:39 (Sunrise night 1)

DVD
"Hello, Goodbye"
"Jet" (Paul McCartney, Linda McCartney)
"All My Loving"
"Live and Let Die" (Paul McCartney, Linda McCartney)
"Coming Up" (Paul McCartney)
"Blackbird"
"We Can Work It Out"
"Here, There, and Everywhere"
"Eleanor Rigby"
"Matchbox" (Carl Perkins)
"Your Loving Flame" (Paul McCartney)
"The Fool on the Hill"
"Getting Better"
"Here Today" (Paul McCartney)
"Something" (George Harrison)
"Band on the Run" (Paul McCartney, Linda McCartney)
"Let Me Roll It" (Paul McCartney, Linda McCartney)
"Back in the USSR"
"My Love" (Paul McCartney, Linda McCartney)
"Maybe I'm Amazed" (Paul McCartney)
"Freedom" (Paul McCartney)
"Let it Be"
"Hey Jude"
"Can't Buy Me Love"
"Lady Madonna"
"The Long and Winding Road"
"Yesterday"
"Sgt. Pepper's Lonely Hearts Club Band" / "The End"
"I Saw Her Standing There"

Bonus tracks
"Driving Rain" (Paul McCartney)
"Every Night" (Paul McCartney)
"You Never Give Me Your Money"/"Carry That Weight"

Charts

Weekly charts

Album

DVD

Year-end charts

Certifications

Album

DVD

References

Sources

 
 Kimsey, John (2006). "Spinning the Historical Record: Lennon, McCartney, and Museum Politics". In: Kenneth Womack and Todd F. Davis (eds). Reading the Beatles: Cultural Studies, Literary Criticism, and the Fab Four. Albany, NY: SUNY Press. .
 
 

2002 live albums
2002 video albums
Albums produced by David Kahne
Capitol Records live albums
Capitol Records video albums
Live video albums
Paul McCartney live albums
Paul McCartney video albums